The Nirmalapura Wind Farm is a  wind farm consisting of seven wind turbines, located on the west coast of Nirmalapura, Puttalam, Sri Lanka.

The wind power company is a joint venture between Akbar Brothers, Debug Group, Hayleys, and Hirdaramani Group.

See also 

 Electricity in Sri Lanka
 List of power stations in Sri Lanka

References 

Wind farms in Sri Lanka
Buildings and structures in Puttalam District